McDonogh High School can refer to:
John McDonogh High School, New Orleans, Louisiana
McDonogh 35 High School, New Orleans, Louisiana
McDonogh School, Owings Mills, Maryland